Bockstael is a Brussels Metro station on line 6. It opened on 6 October 1982 and is named after the / in Laeken, in the north-west of the City of Brussels, Belgium, where it is located. Prior to the opening of the extension to Heizel/Heysel metro station in 1985, the station was the western terminus of former line 1A (now line 6).

The station allows transfer to and from suburban railway line 50 to Aalst and Dendermonde via Belgian Rail. A two track railway station with side platforms is integrated into the subway complex and replaced Laeken's old railway station, located about  eastwards.

External links

 Station ID - Bockstael, bsubway.net

Brussels metro stations
Railway stations opened in 1982
City of Brussels
1982 establishments in Belgium